Anyang Foreign Language High School is a private high school in South Korea. The school is located in Anyang Country of the Gyeonggi Province. The school is classified as a foreign language high school.

It is designed for the study of English, Chinese, and Japanese. The school is divided into three departments: The Department of English, the Department of Chinese, and the Department of Japanese.
The overall purpose of the department is to create global leaders through an exchange of culture and subsequently naturally understanding the languages.

History

Founding

Current
AFLHS avoids conventions of education in Korea. For example, the school has no bells to begin or end classes. This means autonomy of both teachers and students. Students also have their own study groups. In each study group, students have debates and discussions on their favorite topics. The school has a computer registration program for taking special courses. All students can register courses that they want to take by using the special computer program at home. It is like the current system of many universities.

School activities

Cultural exchange
The school has many sistership schools abroad: Delhi Public School in India, Waseda University Honjo Senior High School in Japan, Hanoi - Amsterdam High School in Vietnam and more. Students visit sister schools more than once a year. Students from sistership schools experience homestays with A.F.L.H.S. students, as well. Every year, students go abroad for a week to experience foreign cultures: Japan, China, and Singapore. Students have cultural exchanges with undergraduate students of Waseda University and the National University of Singapore.

Club activities
There are currently more than 50 clubs for extra activities. Student can join the clubs they want, such as WOW (football club), EDIT (English Journal), UNESCO (volunteer work), Show Time (English Musical), Silchunsarang (sign language), and many sports, drama, and broadcasting clubs. A student can join more than one club so they experience various kinds of activities.

Teacher evaluation system
At the end of a semester, students evaluate their homeroom teacher and their subject teachers. Students can write whatever they want about teachers. They can also point out good things and bad things about school policies. The teacher evaluation allows teachers to have the time to review the last semester and to prepare for the next semester.

See also
Gwacheon Foreign Language High School

References

Schools in Gyeonggi Province
Language high schools in South Korea
Educational institutions established in 1993
1993 establishments in South Korea